Group D of the EuroBasket 2011 took place between 31 August and 5 September 2011. The group played all of its games at Klaipėda Arena in Klaipėda, Lithuania.

The group was composed of Bulgaria, Georgia, Russia, Ukraine, Belgium and Slovenia. Georgia was playing in its first ever European Basketball Championship after finishing second at the qualification group C. The three best ranked teams advanced to the second round.

Standings

All times are local (UTC+3)

31 August

Belgium vs. Georgia

Slovenia vs. Bulgaria

Russia vs. Ukraine

1 September

Bulgaria vs. Belgium

Georgia vs. Russia

Ukraine vs. Slovenia

3 September

Ukraine vs. Bulgaria

Slovenia vs. Georgia

Russia vs. Belgium

4 September

Georgia vs. Ukraine

Bulgaria vs. Russia

Belgium vs. Slovenia

5 September

Georgia vs. Bulgaria

Slovenia vs. Russia

Ukraine vs. Belgium

External links
Standings and fixtures

FIBA EuroBasket 2011
2011–12 in Slovenian basketball
2011–12 in Russian basketball
2011–12 in Ukrainian basketball
2011 in Georgian sport
2011–12 in Belgian basketball
2011–12 in Bulgarian basketball
Sports competitions in Klaipėda